Culex (Lutzia) halifaxi is a species of mosquito belonging to the genus Culex. It is found in Australia, New Zealand, Indonesia and Sri Lanka

The parasite Amblyospora trinus was discovered from this mosquito. It is found in Australia. Larvae are predatory and cannibalistic, they can be found in clear waters with grassy banks.

References

External links 
Culex halifaxi (mosquito)
Ultrastructural characterization and comparative phylogenetic analysis of new microsporidia from Siberian mosquitoes: Evidence for coevolution and host switching

halifaxi
Insects described in 1990